Claremont is a western suburb of Perth, Western Australia, on the north bank of the Swan River.

History
Prior to European settlement, the Noongar people used the area as a source of water, for fishing and for catching waterfowl.

In 1830, John Butler, a settler, set up an inn at Freshwater Bay (in modern-day Peppermint Grove) to attract travellers on the road from Perth to Fremantle. A wetland became known as Butler's Swamp (later Lake Claremont). After the arrival of convicts in the colony in 1850, work began on constructing the Fremantle Road. The government allocated land on the foreshore and at Butler's Swamp to 19 Pensioner Guards and their families, and a permanent convict depot operated at Freshwater Bay (until 1875).

A state school (1862) and church were built, and a community grew around what is now Victoria Avenue. A settler named James Morrison acquired a property at Swan Location 702, and named it Claremont Estate, after his wife, Clara (née de Burgh). During the 1870s, a number of prominent families, including the Triggs, Sandovers and Stirlings, acquired land in the district, around the later site of Christ Church Grammar School; some of their homes were later bought and used by the school.

In 1881, the railway line from Perth to Fremantle was built, along with a station at Butler's Swamp; the name of the station was changed to Claremont in 1883. The focus of the community shifted to the area between the railway line, Fremantle Road (Stirling Highway) and Bay View Terrace.  The Freshwater Bay school ceased to play a central role; it became a boarding house nicknamed "’Appy ‘Ome" in 1892 (and in 1975 a museum).

Land speculators bought in the area and subdivided blocks at varying sizes, leading to a wide class diversity within the suburb. By about 1903, the entire suburb, other than a dozen or so streets, had been subdivided, and by the Second World War, the community was firmly established.

Geography
Claremont is bounded by Airlie Street to the south; Stirling Highway, Congdon Street and Stirling Road to the west; Alfred Road to the north and Loch Street and Bay Road to the east. A large part of Claremont is residential, although a significant shopping area is located along Stirling Highway, and the Claremont Showground and the eastern half of Lake Claremont are within Claremont's boundaries.

Claremont has grand homes in the Agett Road and Richardson Avenue areas on the south side of Stirling Highway, while lesser areas include the areas around Ashton Avenue to the north.

Population
At the 2016 census, Claremont had a population of 8,148 people. 61.1% of people were born in Australia. The next most common countries of birth were England 8.5%, South Africa 1.9%, China 1.9% and New Zealand 1.7%.  78.3% of people spoke only English at home. Other languages spoken at home included Mandarin at 2.1%. The most common responses for religion were No Religion 32.2%, Anglican 21.3% and Catholic 19.1%.

Of the employed people in Claremont, 6.4% worked in hospitals (excepting psychiatric hospitals). Other major industries of employment included higher education 4.0%, combined primary and secondary education 3.9%, legal services 3.5% and cafes and restaurants 3.3%.

Of occupied private dwellings in Claremont 46.5% were separate houses, 25.3% were semi-detached and 27.5% were flats or apartments.

Facilities

Claremont includes the Claremont Showground and the Claremont Oval, home ground of the Claremont Football Club, as well as a significant shopping area along Stirling Highway, most concentrated on the St Quentins Avenue precinct. The suburb also contains several nightspots including Claremont Hotel, On the Terrace and Club Bay View.

Several private schools including Methodist Ladies' College, Christ Church Grammar School, Presbyterian Ladies' College, John XXIII College and Scotch College are either in Claremont or within  of the suburb boundary. Claremont also contains a small private hospital (Bethesda) and one state primary school; Freshwater Bay Primary School (formed by the amalgamation of Claremont Primary School and East Claremont Primary School), as well as a number of jetties on the Swan River.

The Perth Royal Show, an annual agricultural show, is held at the Claremont Showground. The Showground also hosts several large events and music festivals throughout the year.

The suburb contains a number of heritage-listed sites, including the Claremont Post Office and the weatherboard ANZAC Cottage.

Transport
Claremont is served by the Claremont railway station and Loch Street railway station at regular times, as well as the Showgrounds railway station during special events. Various buses, including the CircleRoute, travel along Stirling Highway and through Claremont's northern and southern sections. All services are operated by the Public Transport Authority.

Politics
Claremont is part of the federal division of Curtin. The federal seat is held by the independent Kate Chaney. It was typically regarded as a safe seat for the Liberal Party  until the most recent election, as it had been continually retained by the Liberal Party with the exception of former Liberal member Allan Rocher as an independent politician between 1996 and 1998 and the current member Kate Chaney. For the parliament of Western Australia, Claremont is divided between the state electoral districts of Cottesloe and Nedlands, both held by the Liberal Party. The current mayor of Claremont is Jock Barker.

Notable residents 
 Jessie Forsyth (1847/49 – 1937), temperance advocate
 Kimberley Michael (Kim) Durack (1917–1968), agricultural scientist
 Adelaide Kane (born 1990) actress
 Sheila Mary McClemans (1909–1988), barrister and naval officer
 Donald Alexander Stockdrill (1923–1980), civil engineer
 Colin Syme (1903–1986), businessman
 Gwyn White (née Shirley) (1913–2020), first female umpire for the Davis Cup

Social gatherings
The corner of Bayview Terrace and Gugeri Street is a popular area for bars and pubs during the evening.

See also
 Claremont serial killings
 Town of Claremont

References

External links
 Town of Claremont Website
 Claremont Heritage Trail
 Friends of Lake Claremont

 
Suburbs of Perth, Western Australia
Town of Claremont